Phalanta eurytis, the forest leopard, forest leopard fritillary, or African leopard fritillary, is a butterfly of the family Nymphalidae. It is found in tropical Africa, Ethiopia, and Sudan.

The wingspan is 40–45 mm for males and 43–48 mm for females. Adults are on wing year round with a peak from January to June.

The larvae feed on Dovyalis rhamnoides, Dovyalis caffra, Populus, Trimeria, Maytenus, and Salix species.

Subspecies
Phalanta eurytis eurytis (tropical Africa)
Phalanta eurytis microps (Rothschild & Jordan, 1903) (Sudan, Ethiopia, Uganda, Kenya)

References

Vagrantini
Butterflies of Africa
Taxa named by Edward Doubleday
Butterflies described in 1847